This is a list of diplomatic missions of Israel, excluding honorary consulates. As of November 2021, there are 82 resident embassies, including a Taiwan office, and 22 consulate-generals and two representative missions in the 164 states that recognise Israel.

Israel also maintains five missions to multilateral organisations, of which four missions are to the United Nations and one mission to the European Union. Israel also maintains an economic and cultural office in Taiwan and a representative office to the International Renewable Energy Agency in the United Arab Emirates.

Israel's biggest diplomatic coup in the international community came with peace treaties and recognition from Arab countries such as Egypt in the late 1970s, and Jordan in the early 1990s, leading to embassies being opened in Cairo and Amman. During the late 1980s, several Israeli embassies were opened/reopened in former Eastern Bloc states as the Cold War ended. At the beginning of the 1990s, Israel established official relations with the Soviet Union, India and China. The prospects of a Middle East peace agreement in the mid-1990s led to Israeli government offices appearing as trade representative offices being opened in a handful of Arab states such as Bahrain, Qatar, Tunisia, Oman and Morocco. By 2000s, all have since closed the Israeli offices. Israel closed its embassies in Mauritania and Venezuela after the Gaza War, following a request to do so by their national governments. Following the signing of the Abraham Accords, Israel opened embassies in Abu Dhabi and Manama in 2021, a consulate-general in Dubai, and a liaison office in Rabat.

Since 2014, German diplomatic missions have provided Israeli citizens with consular assistance in all states where Israel has no official diplomatic representation.

Africa

 Luanda (Embassy)

 Yaoundé (Embassy)

 Cairo (Embassy)

 Addis Ababa (Embassy)

 Accra (Embassy)

 Abidjan (Embassy)

 Nairobi (Embassy)

 Rabat (Liaison Office)

 Abuja (Embassy)

Kigali (Embassy)

 Dakar (Embassy)

 Pretoria (Embassy)

Americas

 Buenos Aires (Embassy)

 Brasilia (Embassy)
 São Paulo (Consulate-General)

 Ottawa (Embassy)
 Montreal (Consulate-General)
 Toronto (Consulate-General)

 Santiago de Chile (Embassy)

 Bogotá (Embassy)

 San José (Embassy)

 Santo Domingo (Embassy)

 Quito (Embassy)

 Guatemala City (Embassy)
 
 Tegucigalpa (Embassy)

 Mexico City (Embassy)

 Panama City (Embassy)

 Lima (Embassy)

 Washington, D.C. (Embassy)
 Atlanta (Consulate-General)
 Boston (Consulate-General)
 Chicago (Consulate-General)
 Houston (Consulate-General)
 Los Angeles (Consulate-General)
 Miami (Consulate-General)
 New York (Consulate-General)
 San Francisco (Consulate-General)

 Montevideo (Embassy)

Asia

 Baku (Embassy)

 Manama (Embassy)

 Beijing (Embassy)
 Chengdu (Consulate-General)
 Guangzhou (Consulate-General)
 Hong Kong (Consulate-General)
 Shanghai (Consulate-General)

 Tbilisi (Embassy)

 New Delhi (Embassy)
 Bangalore (Consulate-General)
 Mumbai (Consulate-General)

 Tokyo (Embassy)

 Amman (Embassy)

 Astana (Embassy)

 Yangon (Embassy)

 Kathmandu (Embassy)

 Manila (Embassy)

 Singapore (Embassy)

 Seoul (Embassy)

Taipei (Israel Economic and Cultural Office in Taipei)

 Bangkok (Embassy)

 Ankara (Embassy)
 Istanbul (Consulate-General)

 Ashgabat (Embassy)

 Abu Dhabi (Embassy)
 Dubai (Consulate-General)

 Tashkent (Embassy)

 Hanoi (Embassy)

Europe

 Tirana (Embassy)

 Vienna (Embassy)

 Minsk (Embassy)

 Brussels (Embassy)

 Sofia (Embassy)

 Zagreb (Embassy)

 Nicosia (Embassy)

 Prague (Embassy)

 Copenhagen (Embassy)

 Helsinki (Embassy)

 Paris (Embassy)
 Marseille (Consulate-General)

 Berlin (Embassy)
 Munich (Consulate-General)

 Athens (Embassy)

 Rome (Embassy)

 Budapest (Embassy)

 Dublin (Embassy)

 Rome (Embassy)

 Riga (Embassy)

 Vilnius (Embassy)

 The Hague (Embassy)

 Oslo (Embassy)

 Warsaw (Embassy)

 Lisbon (Embassy)

 Bucharest (Embassy)

 Moscow (Embassy)
 St. Petersburg (Consulate-General) 

 Belgrade (Embassy)

 Bratislava (Embassy)

 Madrid (Embassy)

 Stockholm (Embassy)

 Bern (Embassy)

 Kyiv (Embassy)

 London (Embassy)

Oceania

 Canberra (Embassy)

 Wellington (Embassy)

Multilateral organisations
Brussels  (permanent mission to the European Union)
Geneva  (permanent mission to United Nations institutions)
New York City (permanent mission to the United Nations)
Paris (permanent mission to United Nations institutions)
Vienna (permanent mission to United Nations institutions)

Gallery

Diplomatic Missions to Open

Manama (Embassy)

N'Djamena (Embassy)

Rabat (Embassy)

Khartoum (Embassy)

Closed missions

 La Paz (Embassy) — closed in 2009 

 Nouakchott (Embassy) — closed in 2009

 Caracas (Embassy) — closed in 2009

See also
 List of diplomatic missions in Israel
 Foreign relations of Israel

Notes

References

External links
Israeli Ministry of Foreign Affairs

 
Israel
Diplomatic missions